Riwaq or Centre for Architectural Conservation is a center for the preservation of architectural heritage on the West Bank in Palestine. The organization is based in Ramallah and owes its name mainly to a riwaq, which is an arcade in Islamic architecture.

Riwaq was founded in 1991 with the aim to preserve cultural heritage. Researchers of the center have compiled a detailed register of historic buildings in Palestine. Buildings at this location are frequently threatened by military occupation and counter actions of inhabitants. In the course of twenty years since its foundation, Riwaq had completed more than one hundred restoration projects, including major monuments in the Old City of Jerusalem and the renovation of historic streets in the historical part of Bethlehem.

Awards
Riwaq was awarded several times:
2006: Dubai International Award For the Best Practices to Improve the Living Environment
2007: Good Governance Certificate, of Transparency Palestine - The AMAN Coalition, Ramallah
2007: Qattan Distinction Award, of A. M. Qattan Foundation's Culture & Arts Programme, Ramallah
2010: Palestine International Award for Excellence and Creativity
2011: Prince Claus Award
2012: Curry Stone Design Prize
2013: Aga Khan Award for Architecture
2014: Holcim Awards Africa Middle East

References 

Non-profit organizations based in the State of Palestine
Architecture in the State of Palestine
Organizations based in Al-Bireh
Historic preservation organizations